Hilarographa uthaithani is a species of moth of the family Tortricidae. It is found in Thailand.

The wingspan is about 14 mm. The ground colour of the forewings is olive ochreous with brownish suffusions in the form of two postbasal interfasciae separated by olive brown parallel fascia with bluish refraction. The hindwings are brown, but darker on the peripheries.

Etymology
The name refers to the type locality.

References

Moths described in 2009
Hilarographini